A Book of Hours is the tenth studio album by Bob Ostertag, self-released on June 9, 2013.

Track listing

Personnel
Adapted from the A Book of Hours liner notes.

Musicians
 Bob Ostertag – sampler

Additional musicians
 Theo Bleckmann – voice
 Shelley Hirsch – voice
 Phil Minton – voice
 Roscoe Mitchell – saxophone

Release history

References

External links 
 A Book of Hours at Bandcamp

2013 albums
Bob Ostertag albums